Homburg or Hombourg may refer to

Places

In Germany
 Homburg, Saarland, capital of the Saarpfalz district of Saarland
 Bad Homburg vor der Höhe, town and spa in Hesse
 Homburg Forest, (Homburgwald) a hill range in Lower Saxony
 Homburg, a quarter of Triefenstein, Bavaria
 Homburg Castle, in Nümbrecht, North Rhine-Westphalia
 Bad Homburg Castle or Schloss Bad Homburg, in Bad Homburg vor der Höhe
 Reichsherrschaft Homburg, a small state around the castle from 1276 to 1806

In France
 Hombourg, a commune in Haut-Rhin
 Hombourg-Budange, a commune in Bas-Rhin
 Hombourg-Haut, a commune in Moselle

Elsewhere
 Homburg, Switzerland, municipality in the canton of Thurgau
 Hombourg, Belgium, a village in the municipality of Plombières

People with the surname
 Eril Homburg (born 1936-2017), Australian basketball player
 Ernst Homburg (born 1952), Dutch chemist and historian
 Hermann Homburg (1874–1964), South Australian politician and lawyer, son of Robert
 Robert Homburg (1848–1912), South Australian politician and judge
 Robert Otto Homburg (1876–1948), South Australian politician and cricketer, son of Robert
 Stefan Homburg (born 1961), German economist
 Wilhelm von Homburg (1940–2004), German boxer and actor

Other uses
 Homburg hat, a semi-formal felt hat popularised in the 20th century
 "Homburg" (song), by British rock group Procol Harum, 1967
 Der Prinz von Homburg (opera), German opera by Hans Werner Henze
 The Prince of Homburg (play), German play by Heinrich von Kleist
 The Prince of Homburg (film), 1997 Italian film
 Homburg Canada, a real estate investment trust, owner of Montreal Central Station

See also
 Hamburg (disambiguation)
 Homberg (disambiguation)

German-language surnames